The Fairview Tithing Office/Bishop's Storehouse is a historic building in Fairview, Utah, United States. It was built with red bricks in 1908 as a tithing office and bishop's office for the Church of Jesus Christ of Latter-day Saints. The bishop at the time was James C. Peterson. The building was designed in the Victorian Eclectic architectural style, with a pyramid roof. It was sold to Henry A. Rasmussen, who remodelled it as a private residence, in 1932. It has been listed on the National Register of Historic Places since January 25, 1985.

References

	
National Register of Historic Places in Sanpete County, Utah
Victorian architecture in Utah
Religious buildings and structures completed in 1908
Tithing buildings of the Church of Jesus Christ of Latter-day Saints
1908 establishments in Utah